Tax Season is the debut solo album by American rapper Chucky Workclothes. It was originally released on February 24, 2015, by RBC Records, then later released on August 24, 2015 under his own brand. The album features guest appearances from Crooked I, Pusha T, Kurupt, E-40, Young Buck, Young Bleed and more. The album was supported by the singles "Tax Season" featuring Crooked I, "State To State" featuring E-40 and "Nothing Moves" featuring Kurupt.

Track listings

References

External links
Tax Season on iTunes.
Tax Season on Amazon.com

2015 albums
Chucky Workclothes albums